Basic Shape are an Australian indie/pop/folk band based in Melbourne.

History
Their debut album Boat Without A Sail was released in April 2008 through Green/MGM, and was Album of The Week on ABC Tasmania. The album was recorded over three years at Audrey Studios and engineered and co-produced by Craig Pilkington from The Killjoys. The first single from the album, White Skin, was played on several ABC radio stations around Australia, and was Single of the Week in Melbourne's Beat Magazine.

Basic Shape is based primarily on the songwriting partnership of guitarist Mick Carney and singer Gerry Eeman. The band was formed in September 2002 when Eeman was offered a gig slot at Melbourne music venue Bar Open in five days time. At that time the band did not actually exist, so Eeman invited some friends from Northern Melbourne Institute of TAFE music program to play the show with him, which became the initial line-up of the band.

The current line up is Gerry Eeman (also in The Guild League), Mick Carney, Rob Callea, and John Beddoe.

Discography

Albums
Boat Without A Sail (2008)

Singles
White Skin (2008)
Rainy Day (2008)

References

External links 
 
Myspace site

Australian indie rock groups